The 2017–18 season was Liverpool Football Club's 126th season in existence and their 56th consecutive season in the top flight of English football. It was also the club's 26th consecutive season in the Premier League. Along with the Premier League, Liverpool also competed in the FA Cup, EFL Cup and UEFA Champions League. The season covered the period from 1 July 2017 to 30 June 2018. It began with an away 3–3 draw against Watford in the league and ended with a 3–1 loss to Real Madrid in the UEFA Champions League final.

Season review

Pre-season
Liverpool began their preseason in the same manner as last year, a visit to Tranmere Rovers on 12 July. Liverpool won 0–4 with goals from James Milner (from the penalty spot), Marko Grujić, Pedro Chirivella, and Ben Woodburn (from the penalty spot as well.) The Reds next trip was to Wigan Athletic on 14 July where they drew 1–1 going 1–0 down early, but the equalizing goal coming in first half stoppage time from new signing Mohamed Salah. On 19 July, Liverpool played their first match of the 2017 Premier League Asia Trophy friendly tournament in Hong Kong against Crystal Palace. The Reds won 2–0 thanks to goals from another new signing, Dominic Solanke, and Divock Origi. The Reds advanced to the final, played on 22 July, the day after announcing new signing Andrew Robertson on a deal from Hull City, against Leicester City. Liverpool won the tournament defeating Leicester in the final 2–1, despite conceding first, due to goals from Salah and Philippe Coutinho.

Liverpool returned to Europe to play their next pre-season match on 29 July against Hertha BSC, a match that celebrated the two clubs respective 125th anniversaries of existence. Liverpool got the better of the German side winning 0–3 in Berlin with goals scored by Solanke, Gini Wijnaldum, and Salah. Liverpool's next two matches were as a part of another pre-season tournament as the club partook in the 2017 Audi Cup, defeating Bayern Munich at Bayern's home stadium 0–3 in their first match of the tournament on 1 August, the goals coming from Sadio Mané, yet another from Salah, and Daniel Sturridge. In the final on the next day, Liverpool lost to Atlético Madrid, 1–1 (4–5 in penalties) with a Roberto Firmino spot kick pushing the game to penalties before ultimately losing. In the days before their final pre-season match, Liverpool were dealt a blow as it was revealed that Adam Lallana was injured in the final and, according to manager Jürgen Klopp, would be out for "a couple of months." In the final friendly on 5 August in Dublin against Athletic Bilbao, Liverpool finished strong winning the match 3–1 thanks to Firmino's spot kick, Woodburn's strike in the second half, and Solanke's headed finish.

August
Liverpool began their Premier League campaign on 12 August with a trip to Vicarage Road to take on Watford. Watford opened the scoring in the eighth minute with a Stefano Okaka header off a corner kick, however Mane levelled in the 29th minute, only for Abdoulaye Doucouré to give Watford a 2–1 in the 32nd where it stood at the half. In the second half, Liverpool took the lead after goals from Firmino from the spot and Salah in the 55th and 57th minutes, respectively. However, in the 93rd Miguel Britos once again levelled the game with a controversial equalizer off another corner kick to set the score at 3–3 where the game finished. Following the match, manager Klopp expressed disappointment in the equalizer counting making the claim that Britos was offside when scoring. Liverpool had no time to despair over lost points as they set off to Germany to square off with Hoffenheim in the first leg of their Champions League qualifier on 15 August. The match was Liverpool's first Champions League match since December 2014. In the tenth minute, Simon Mignolet made a penalty save to keep the game level at 0–0 where it stood until Trent Alexander-Arnold's 35th minute free kick goal, the first in a Liverpool shirt for him. A James Milner attempted cross deflected off Håvard Nordtveit and that went down as an own goal to make it 0–2 in the 74th. Hoffenheim responded with a Mark Uth 87th-minute goal but, despite the nervy finish, Liverpool saw off the final minutes of the 1–2 victory in the away leg. Liverpool returned home for the first time in the season where on 19 August they played Crystal Palace. The Reds were victorious defeating Palace 1–0 thanks to a Mane goal in the 73rd. This marked the first victory at home against Palace for Liverpool since 2013. On 23 August, Liverpool played the home leg of their Champions League qualifier against Hoffenheim. Liverpool got off to a fantastic early start with a 3–0 scoreline after 21 minutes thanks to two goals from Emre Can and one from Salah. Uth pulled one back in the 28th to make it 3–1, however, Firmino tacked one more on in the 63rd making it 4–1. Sandro Wagner made it 4–2 in the 79th, but it was only a consolation goal as Liverpool won 4–2 (6–3 on aggregate) and advanced on to the Champions League group stage. Liverpool's final game of the month, and before the international break, was at home against Arsenal on 27 August. In what was called a "dazzling attacking display", Liverpool won 4–0 thanks to goals before the half from Firmino and Mane in the 17th and 40th minutes, respectively, and goals after the half from Salah in the 57th minute and Sturridge in the 77th minute. On 29 August Liverpool made a transfer move for the 2018–19 season as the club announced Naby Keïta from RB Leipzig would join the club effective 1 July 2018.

September
Liverpool's September began with a visit to the Etihad Stadium to take on Manchester City on 9 September. Manchester City opened the scoring through Sergio Agüero in the 25th minute, and a Mane high boot drew a hotly-debated red card putting the Reds down to ten men. From there City scored four more goals, two from Gabriel Jesus and two from Leroy Sané to mark a 5–0 victory. Liverpool manager Klopp felt that the challenge was not a red card worthy incident and noted the event was a "game-changing incident." Liverpool next began UEFA Champions League group stage play at home against Sevilla on 13 September. The Reds went down in the 5th minute after a costly Dejan Lovren mistake allowed Wissam Ben Yedder to tap Sevilla ahead. Liverpool roared back in response with a Firmino goal in the 21st and a Salah goal in the 37th to put them back on top before the half. In the 41st minute, however, with the chance to put Liverpool ahead by two goals, Firmino missed a chance from the penalty spot. Joaquín Correa drew Sevilla level in the 72nd and the game finished at 2–2. Liverpool faced a Premier League fixture next as they squared off with Burnley on 16 September. The match was notable for being Philippe Coutinho's return to the Liverpool starting eleven following a busy transfer window in which Barcelona had widely reported interest in the player to the point where the club released a statement explicitly stating Coutinho would remain a Liverpool player at the close of the summer window. Scott Arfield put the visitors up 0–1 in the 27th, however Salah responded with an equalizer just three minutes later to put the scoreline at 1–1 where it stood till the final whistle. The Reds faced another midweek test on 19 September where they faced off with Leicester City at King Power Stadium in the Carabao Cup. Leicester scored twice in the second half through Shinji Okazaki and Islam Slimani in the 65th and 78th minutes to knock the Reds out of the Cup tournament with a 2–0 defeat. That weekend, on 23 September, Liverpool played a second game at King Power Stadium against Leicester, this time in the league. Salah kicked off scoring in the 15th while Coutinho scored his first goal of the season with a stunning free kick in the 23rd to put Liverpool up 0–2. Right before the halftime whistle, Okazaki got Leicester a goal back on a scrambled effort off a corner kick. Captain Jordan Henderson put the Reds up 1–3 in the 68th with a counter-attacking goal, however Jamie Vardy got the goal back just a minute later. In the 73rd, goalie Simon Mignolet gave up a penalty kick, which, taken by Vardy, was saved by the keeper to keep the scoreline at 2–3, the final score. The final game of the month was another Champions League group stage bout, this time in Moscow against Spartak Moscow on 26 September. Spartak opened the scoring off a 23rd minute Fernando free kick, however Liverpool responded in the 31st through a Coutinho goal. The game finished level at one and Liverpool earned another point in group stage play.

October
Liverpool opened their October on the first of the month at St James' Park against Newcastle. Coutinho, through an out of the box effort, put Liverpool ahead in the 29th minute, however Newcastle leveled just seven minutes later through a Joselu goal that resulted after an attempted Joël Matip tackle deflected off Joselu and into the net. The scoreline remained at 1–1 for the rest of the game resulting in a draw. Following the international break, the Reds returned to action on 14 October at Anfield to square off with Manchester United in a match that ended 0–0. The Reds then returned to midweek action heading to Slovenia to take on Maribor on 17 October. In a record breaking performance, Liverpool thrashed Maribor 0–7 breaking the record for biggest away win not just in Liverpool history but by any English side in the European competition. Goals came from Firmino, Coutinho, Salah, another from Firmino, a second from Salah, the first of Alex Oxlade-Chamberlain's Liverpool career, and a capper from Trent Alexander-Arnold. On 22 October, Liverpool visited Wembley Stadium to take on Tottenham. The Reds fell behind 2–0 quickly following defensive mistakes in which Lovren drew heavy criticism for. Lovren was later subbed off for Chamberlain at the 30th minute. Salah drew Liverpool back one in the 24th, but Dele Alli chipped a goal in before the stroke of halftime. Harry Kane put in his second of the game in the 56th and the Reds were given a 4–1 defeat. The final fixture of the month took place on 28 October back at Anfield against newly promoted Huddersfield Town, managed by Klopp's longtime friend David Wagner. Following a 0–0 first half, including a saved Salah penalty in the 43rd, the Reds put three past Huddersfield in the second half. The first came from Sturridge in the 50th, the second from Firmino just eight minutes later, and the final coming from Wijnaldum in the 75th to cap off a 3–0 victory.

November
November opened up for Liverpool on the first of the month at Anfield in their home fixture against Maribor in the Champions League group stage. Following a goalless first half, the Reds scored three in the second to get a 3–0 victory over their Slovenian counterparts. The goals came from Salah in the 49th, Emre Can in the 64th, and Sturridge in the 90th. The Reds were also given a penalty kick in the 54th, but Milner could not take advantage. This victory put the Reds one point clear at the top of their group. Following that mid-week bout, the Reds then traveled to London to take on West Ham on 4 November. Salah and Matip put the Reds ahead 0–2 at the half as they scored within three minutes of each other, but West Ham countered in the 55th through Manuel Lanzini. Just a minute later, however, the Reds got their goal back through Oxlade-Chamberlain's first league goal as a Liverpool player. Salah added his second of the game in the 75th and Liverpool went on to a 1–4 victory in what was ultimately Slaven Bilić's final match in charge of the Hammers. Following international break, the Reds were back in action on 18 November at home against Southampton, marking Virgil van Dijk's first visit to Anfield following links with Liverpool in which the club had to make a public statement renouncing interest in the Dutchman. The Reds enjoyed two first-half goals in ten minutes from Salah and a third in the 68th minute from Coutinho en route to a 3–0 victory. Up next was the second meeting in the group against Sevilla, this time in Spain on 21 November. The Reds roared at the start with goals from Firmino in the 2nd, Mane in the 22nd, and Firmino again in the 30th to go up 0–3 at the half. Unfortunately, the good times stopped there as Ben Yedder scored first in the 51st off an Éver Banega free kick, then again in the 60th off a penalty kick, both of which the fouls conceded were given up by Alberto Moreno, who received substantial criticism for these two missteps in spite of his otherwise solid "reboot" to his Liverpool career. Liverpool held on until the 93rd minute in which Guido Pizarro leveled the game at 3–3 and completed the Sevilla comeback. The Reds took a point, however, and remained at the top of the group through five games. The Reds then had to look to recover in time for their weekend bout back at Anfield against defending champions Chelsea on 25 November. Salah scored against his former club putting Liverpool up 1–0 in the 65th, but off the bench Willian equalized at 1–1 in the 85th on a shot that appeared to be an attempt to cross the ball. The score stayed this way till the end and twice in a week Liverpool let in a late equalizer. The final fixture of the month occurred at the Bet365 Stadium as Liverpool traveled to take on Stoke City in a mid-week Premier League bout on 29 November. Mane put the Reds out front in the 17th and gave them the halftime lead, then Salah, off the bench, scored two in six minutes to give Liverpool the 0–3 victory capping off a month of four games of where the Reds won by three goals.

December
Liverpool opened a busy December with a game at the Falmer Stadium against Brighton & Hove Albion on 2 December. Two goals within a minute of each other, first from Can (who was playing at centre back) then Firmino, gave Liverpool a 0–2 lead and they finished the game winning 1–5 thanks to additional goals from Firmino, Coutinho, and a Dunk own goal. Brighton's only goal came from Glenn Murray who scored from the penalty spot. The next game was the final game of the Champions League group stage, a home bout against Spartak Moscow on 6 December. Liverpool needed a result to make it to the next round so tensions were running high at Anfield. However, the Reds dispatched Spartak 7–0, with goals coming from Firmino, Salah, a double from Mane and a hat trick for Coutinho and finished the group at the top. The next fixture was the first league installment of the season of the Merseyside derby against crosstown rivals Everton on 10 December at Anfield. Liverpool maintained control throughout the first half and Salah's curling effort in the 42nd minute gave Liverpool the lead. Liverpool continued to dominate but a dubious penalty decision against Lovren saw Wayne Rooney converted a penalty in the 77th to tie the game at 1–1 where it finished. Klopp said following the game about the controversial penalty incident, "In my understanding, it's not a penalty." The next game was yet another held at Anfield where Liverpool hosted West Brom on 13 December. The game was a 0–0 stalemate against West Brom at Anfield, with the most notable event being an 82nd minute Solanke goal was disallowed for a handball drawing conversation on whether or not the correct call was made. On 17 December at the Vitality Stadium, Liverpool took on Bournemouth. The Reds bounced back in the next game winning 0–4 with goals from Coutinho, Lovren, and Salah before the half, and Firmino after. The next game was against Arsenal at the Emirates on 22 December. In an exciting affair, Liverpool went 0–2 up through Coutinho in the 26th and Salah in the 52nd minute, but Arsenal took the lead with three goals in five minutes through goals from Alexis Sánchez, Granit Xhaka (on a long shot in which goalie Mignolet was heavily criticized for not doing better) and Mesut Özil. The Reds evened the score at 3–3 with a 71st-minute goal from Firmino giving the team their 8th league draw in 19 games, at the time the second most in the league. Liverpool then returned to Anfield for their Boxing Day fixture against bottom-place Swansea City. Coutinho gave the Liverpool early in the first half and the game stood at 1–0 at half, but with a goal from Firmino in the 52nd, one from Alexander-Arnold in the 65th, another from Firmino in the 66th, and a capper from Oxlade-Chamberlain in the 82nd gave the Reds a 5–0 victory. On 27 December, ahead of the New Year, Liverpool also welcomed the news of long-term target Virgil van Dijk, signed for a generally reported fee going up to £75 million. With their new signing in attendance, Liverpool played their final match of the calendar year on 30 December against Leicester at Anfield. Vardy gave the Foxes a 0–1 lead in the 3rd where it stood until the 52nd with a Salah equalizer. Salah scored again in the 76th giving Liverpool a 2–1 victory and ensuring the Reds would end 2017 in the top four.

January
The Reds opened their 2018 on the first day of the year by traveling to Turf Moor to take on Burnley. Mane broke the deadlock in the 61st with a goal but Jóhann Berg Guðmundsson leveled the score in the 87th minute. The Reds, however, were able to get all three points off a Ragnar Klavan header in the 94th minute with a 1–2 final. Following the triumph in the league, the Reds hosted Everton for the second time in under 30 days, this time in the third round of the 2017–18 FA Cup on 5 January. While Everton received the hotly contested penalty in the first meeting, Liverpool was the one to benefit from a controversial penalty call as Mason Holgate brought Lallana down inside the box and Milner converted the penalty in the 35th minute. The derby match also featured Holgate and Firmino getting into a verbal altercation shortly before the end of the first half following a push from Holgate to Firmino that sent the latter over the advertising boards. In the 67th minute, Gylfi Sigurðsson scored on a counterattack to equalize the game at one. In the 84th minute, however, van Dijk in his Liverpool debut scored off a corner kick making it 2–1 and marking a second game in a row with a late headed goal from a defender to win the game. The day after, on 6 January, the club made the official announcement that (subject to a medical and personal terms) Coutinho would be leaving for Barcelona on a deal that Paul Joyce of The Times reported could reach up to £142 million. Coutinho was subsequently announced by Barcelona that day. On 14 January, Liverpool took on the undefeated Manchester City at Anfield in hopes of deal City their first loss in the league as well as a measure of revenge for the 0–5 loss the Reds were dealt in the reverse fixture. Liverpool started off strong with an Oxlade-Chamberlain goal in the ninth minute, but City scored an equalizer through in the 40th through a Leroy Sane effort. From the 59th to the 68th, Liverpool extended the lead to 4–1 through goals from Firmino, Mane, and Salah in a thrilling ten minutes of action. City got one back in the 84th from Bernardo Silva and another from İlkay Gündoğan in the 91st put it at 4–3, but the Reds held on and doled City their first loss of the league season. The next game for the Reds was a 22 January meeting in South Wales against Swansea and recently placed manager Carlos Carvalhal. Alfie Mawson scored the lone goal of the match in the 40th minute and the bottom place Swans took all three from the Reds with a 1–0 defeat given to the visitors. In the fourth round proper of the FA Cup, on 27 January, Liverpool took on West Brom. Firmino's chip in the fifth gave the early lead, but a four-minute double to Jay Rodriguez put West Brom up 1–2 in the 11th. Video assistant referee replay played a crucial first half role as it denied Craig Dawson a goal to make the game 1–3, then awarded a penalty to Liverpool, which was subsequently missed by Firmino. West Brom added a third with an own goal from Matip late in first half added time. Salah put the Reds within one in the 78th, but the 2–3 scoreline stood and the Reds were stunned at home by the second from bottom Baggies in the cup. The final fixture of the month was on 30 January where the Reds visited John Smith's Stadium and Huddersfield Town. Emre Can's long range effort in the 26th put the Reds up 0–1 early, and Firmino added a second right before the break. Salah's 78th minute spot kick made it 0–3 and Liverpool finished January with a comfortable victory.

February
February's first fixture occurred on the 4th when the Reds welcomed Tottenham to Anfield. Liverpool were off to a flying start following Salah's goal in the third minute giving Liverpool an early 1–0 lead. The score stayed this way until a screamer from Victor Wanyama in the 80th set off a frenetic close to the game. The 85th minute saw goalie Loris Karius come out and attempt to slide tackle the ball away from Harry Kane, however referee Jon Moss awarded a controversial penalty to Spurs for an infraction where some fans and pundits claimed Kane dived in hopes to win a call. Kane took, and subsequently missed, the kick in the 87th and in the 91st minute, Salah gave an outstanding solo effort to find a seeming winner for the Reds, but yet again a controversial penalty was given when van Dijk attempted to clear the ball from the box but missed and hit Erik Lamela. Kane took this penalty as well and converted in the 95th leaving the game level at 2–2. A frustrated Klopp stated following the game, "I don't understand either of the penalty situations. The first one was offside and the second, I know already what the ref and his assistant will say. There was a touch, a little touch. But Lamela has jumped into him and wanted the touch and to go down." Spurs manager Mauricio Pochettino saw the incidents differently saying, "Both were a penalty and it is not controversial. Sometimes people complain about the referee, but when they are right it is good to tell everyone." The Reds had a week off until their trip to St Mary's Stadium in Southampton on 11 February. In winter signing van Dijk's first match back in Southampton, the Reds won the match 0–2 with goals from Firmino in the sixth and Salah in the 42nd.Although Van Dijk did receive a hostile reception. The next fixture for Liverpool was on Valentine's Day in Portugal where the Reds played in the round of 16 of the Champions League for the first time since 2009. Against Porto, the Reds opened scoring in the 25th through a Mane goal that was also mishandled by Porto keeper José Sá. Salah added another goal in the 29th to take the lead to 0–2, where it stood at the halftime whistle. In the second half, the goals continued as Mane added a second in the 53rd, Firmino scored his first of the game in the 69th, and Mane got his hat-trick goal in the 85th to give the Reds a 0–5 first leg victory. Following a four-day mini camp in Marbella the Reds returned home for their final fixture of the month on 24 February against West Ham. Can opened the scoring with a header off a corner in the 29th, and Salah in the 51st and Firmino in the 57th added on to the lead. Michail Antonio added one for the Hammers in the 59th to put the score at 3–1, but a Mane goal in the 77th to make it 4–1 put the game away and, for the day, the Reds moved into second place.

March
Liverpool's first match of the month was a home bout on 3 March against Newcastle, as the Reds welcomed back manager Rafa Benítez, who won the 2005 Champions League with the club. Salah opened the scoring in the 40th minute and Mane put in another in the 55th to give the Reds a comfortable 2–0 victory over the Magpies. The Reds then played mid-week at home on 6 March against Porto in the return fixture of the Champions League round of 16. It was a quiet affair, Mane had a chance that hit the post and Danny Ings had a strong effort saved, but the game ended 0–0 and Liverpool moved on to the quarterfinals. Following these matches, on 10 March Liverpool traveled to Old Trafford in another iteration of the Northwest Derby against Manchester United. Marcus Rashford scored twice in ten minutes to give United a 2–0 lead within 25 minutes, were the score stood till the half. An Eric Bailly own goal put Liverpool back in business in the 66th, but it was not enough and a 2–1 scoreline was final. The loss put the Reds five points back of second place. On 16 March, the Reds learned that their Champions League quarterfinal opponent would be the only other English team remaining, Manchester City. The fixtures were set for 4 April at Anfield and 10 April at the Etihad. The following day, Liverpool returned to Anfield to square off with Watford and, in stylish fashion, dispatched the Hornets 5–0. Salah had his first English hat trick as he scored in the 4th, 43rd, and 77th, and then added one more for good measure in the 85th. Firmino added in one of his own in the 49th. The final fixture of the month occurred on 31 March at Selhurst Park against Crystal Palace. Palace opened the scoring in the 13th with a Luka Milivojević spot kick and the 1–0 scoreline held into halftime. Just four minutes into the second half, however, Liverpool struck back with a Mane goal off a Milner cross. The 1–1 deadlock was broken as Salah slotted home another in the 84th and the Reds took a 1–2 victory out of London.

April
Liverpool opened up the month of April of the fourth as they took on Manchester City at Anfield in the first leg of the Champions League quarter-finals. The Reds got off to a flying start with goals from Salah in the 12th, Oxlade-Chamberlain off a brilliant effort from outside the box in the 21st, and finally Mane in the 31st. The Reds finished with a comfortable 3–0 victory and for the second time this season defeated City at home. In between the first and second legs, Liverpool traveled across the river to take on Merseyside rivals Everton at Goodison Park on 7 April. The affair ended 0–0, with the best effort coming from Yannick Bolasie, who tried a curling effort only for it to be saved well by Karius. The Reds could not find a goal, and their opportunity to go second in the table was missed. Up next was the second leg of the quarter-finals at the Etihad against Manchester City on 10 April. City needed at least three goals, and they found one almost immediately from Gabriel Jesus in just the second minute. The Reds seemed slightly wobbled, and chances from Bernardo Silva and a goal ruled offside from Leroy Sane highlighted that. Following the half, however, with City manager Pep Guardiola sent to the stands during the break, Liverpool found their away goal in the 56th from Salah, and another in the 77th from Firmino. The Reds would win 1–2 and advance 5–1 on aggregate to the semi-finals. Liverpool returned home to Anfield to take on Bournemouth on 14 April, and they celebrated their advancement with a strong 3–0 showing. The goals came from Mane in the 7th, Salah in the 69th, and Firmino with a 90th minute addition to the scoreline. Next came a match with bottom-place West Brom on 21 April. The Baggies, coming off a victory at Manchester United to clinch the title in favor of Manchester City, had already forced Liverpool to drop points at Anfield and defeated them in the FA Cup. Liverpool found another early goal through Danny Ings, his first since the final match of Brendan Rodgers' tenure as Liverpool manager. Salah added another in the 72nd, and the Reds seemed on their way to all three points. However, a 79th-minute goal from Jake Livermore and an 88th-minute leveler from Salomón Rondón to make it 2–2 meant the points would be shared. Liverpool could not dwell on this result as the final European night at Anfield was on deck on 24 April in the Champions League semi-finals against A.S. Roma. The first key action of the game was not a goal, but rather an injury as Oxlade-Chamberlain went down with what was eventually ruled as a knee ligament injury. The Reds could not find a breakthrough until a sparkling 36th-minute effort from Salah against his former team put the Reds ahead. Salah added another in the first minute of added time of the first half and the Reds carried a 2–0 lead into the second half. The Reds would not stop as Mane added a third in the 56th and Firmino had an eight-minute double to make the lead 5–0. Roma, however, got two key away goals back through Edin Džeko in the 81st and Diego Perotti from the penalty spot after a James Milner handball in the 85th. Regardless, the Reds walked away with a 5–2 and the driver's seat of the second leg. The next day, the club would announce that Oxlade-Chamberlain was set to miss the remainder of the season as well as the 2018 World Cup for England. The final fixture of the month was at Anfield against 19th place Stoke City on 28 April. Liverpool had the best of the chances: a Salah miss on a one-on-one with the keeper in the fifth, an Ings effort ruled out for offside in the 40th, and a controversial potential handball on Erik Pieters in the 87th, but neither team could find the net and the final score was 0–0.

May

Liverpool's May began with the second leg of the Champions League semi-finals against Roma on 2 May. Liverpool quickly got an away goal from Mane in the ninth minute, striking first in the match. Just six minutes later, however, in the 15th minute, Roma would see one back after an attempted Lovren clearance struck Milner directly in the face and back into the Liverpool net. The Reds then saw a second goal in the 25th minute off a Wijnaldum header on a corner kick, marking his first away goal for Liverpool. The match entered the half 1–2 and with Liverpool in strong position to advance, however Roma continue to attack. Dzeko scored in the 52nd to level the match score, then Radja Nainggolan hit an exceptional long shot in the 86th. Finally, Klavan was penalized for Liverpool and Nainggolan achieved a brace off a spot kick in the 94th, but with Roma needed one more for extra time it was too little, too late. The final whistle sounded and Liverpool, while losing 4–2, advanced on an aggregate score of 6–7 and would see Real Madrid in the Champions League Final. That weekend, Liverpool would take on Chelsea on 6 May at Stamford Bridge, with a win sealing top four and Champions League for the next season. Alas, in the 32nd minute, it was Chelsea striker Olivier Giroud who found the lone goal of the game and Chelsea won 1–0, giving them an opportunity to be level with Liverpool on points on the last match-day. This, however, was not the case for Chelsea as they stumbled to Huddersfield 1–1 on 9 May, meaning Liverpool would need, barring a massive goal differential swing, just a draw regardless of Chelsea's final day result to clinch fourth place. Liverpool's final Premier League match of the season took place at Anfield against Brighton & Hove Albion on 13 May. The Reds wasted little time in finding the breakthrough as Salah scored in the 26th minute and sealed the record for most goals in a 38-game Premier League season, with 32. Just five minutes before halftime, Lovren doubled the Reds lead with a massive header. Liverpool continued forward as Solanke and Andy Robertson scored their first Liverpool goals in the 53rd and 85th minutes as Liverpool cruised to a 4–0 victory and, as a result, fourth place in the Premier League.

Kyiv's Olimpiyskiy National Sports Complex hosted the Champions League final on 26 May against the two-time defending champions in Madrid. Liverpool suffered an early blow as Salah sustained what Klopp later specified as a serious injury to "either the collarbone or the shoulder" after just 30 minutes of play. Regardless, the score was 0–0 at the half but in the 51st minute, Karim Benzema pounced on a Karius roll-out of the ball and ultimately get a foot to direct the ball net-bound and give Madrid the 1–0 lead. Liverpool equalized in the 55th through Mane off a corner kick, but nine minutes after that Gareth Bale came off the bench and deliver a stunning bicycle kick to break the deadlock again. Bale found his second of the game and Madrid's third in the 83rd off a long shot that Karius mishandled into his own net. Madrid went on to win the Champions League 3–1 and Karius found harsh criticism for mistakes described as part of a "horror show" of a night for the Liverpool keeper. A few days after the game, Karius was diagnosed with a concussion which likely occurred in a clash between him and Sergio Ramos a few minutes before Madrid's first goal. Despite the season-ending heartbreak, this was Liverpool's best Champions League performance since 2007 and widely considered another step in the right direction for Liverpool as a whole.

First team
As it stands on 26 May 2018

New contracts

Transfers and loans

Transfers in

Transfers out

Loans out

Transfer summary

Spending

Summer:  £ 93,900,000

Winter:  £ 75,000,000

Total:  £ 168,900,000

Income

Summer:  £ 42,000,000

Winter:  £ 106,750,000

Total:  £ 148,750,000

Net Expenditure

Summer:  £ 51,900,000

Winter:  £ 31,750,000

Total:  £ 20,150,000

Friendlies

Pre-season
As of 15 June 2017, Liverpool have announced four pre-season friendlies against Hertha BSC, Athletic Bilbao Tranmere Rovers and Wigan Athletic.

Premier League Asia Trophy

Liverpool faced Crystal Palace in their opening game at the 2017 Premier League Asia Trophy.

Audi Cup

Details for the 2017 Audi Cup were announced on 15 June 2017.

Competitions

Overall

Overview

{| class="wikitable" style="text-align: center"
|-
!rowspan=2|Competition
!colspan=8|Record
|-
!
!
!
!
!
!
!
!
|-
| Premier League

|-
| FA Cup

|-
| EFL Cup

|-
| UEFA Champions League

|-
! Total

Premier League

League table

Results summary

Results by matchday

Matches
On 14 June 2017, the fixtures for the forthcoming season were announced.

FA Cup

In the FA Cup, Liverpool entered in the third round and were drawn at home to Everton.

EFL Cup

Liverpool joined the EFL Cup in the third round and were drawn away to Leicester City.

UEFA Champions League

On 4 August 2017, Liverpool were drawn against Bundesliga side 1899 Hoffenheim in a two-legged tie for a place in the main competition.

Play-off round

Group stage

After beating 1899 Hoffenheim in the qualifiers, Liverpool entered the group stage and were drawn in Group E against Spartak Moscow, Sevilla and Maribor.

Knockout phase

Round of 16
The draw for the round of 16 was held on 11 December 2017, 12:00 CET, at the UEFA headquarters in Nyon, Switzerland.

Quarter-finals
The draw for the quarter-finals was held on 16 March 2018, 12:00 CET, at the UEFA headquarters in Nyon, Switzerland.

Semi-finals
The draw for the semi-finals was held on 13 April 2018, 12:00 CET, at the UEFA headquarters in Nyon, Switzerland.

Final

Squad statistics

Appearances
Players with no appearances not included in the list.

Goalscorers

Includes all competitive matches.

Clean sheets
Includes all competitive matches.
Correct as of matches played on 13 May 2018

Disciplinary record

Club awards

End-of-season awards
The 2018 Liverpool F.C. Players’ Awards event was held at Anfield on 10 May 2018.

Player of the Season: Mohamed Salah
Players’ Player of the Season: Mohamed Salah
Ladies Player of the Season: Gemma Bonner
Ladies Players’ Player of the Season: Sophie Ingle
Young Player of the Season: Trent Alexander-Arnold
Academy Player of the Season: Harry Wilson
Goal of the Season: Alex Oxlade-Chamberlain (vs. Manchester City, 4 April 2018)
Bill Shankly Community Award: Fans Supporting Foodbanks
Lifetime Achievement Award: Ian Callaghan
Outstanding Team Achievement Award: 1978 European Cup-winning team
Supporters’ Club of the Season: New South Wales

Liverpool Standard Chartered Player of the Month award
Awarded monthly to the player that was chosen by fans voting on liverpoolfc.com

References

2017-18
Liverpool
Liverpool